1907 Rudneva, provisional designation , is a stony background asteroid from the central regions of the asteroid belt, approximately 11 kilometers in diameter. It was discovered on 11 September 1972, by astronomer Nikolai Chernykh at the Crimean Astrophysical Observatory, Nauchnyj, on the Crimean peninsula. The asteroid was named after Soviet geodesist and war hero Yevgeniya Rudneva.

Orbit and classification 

Rudneva is a non-family asteroid from the main belt's background population. It orbits the Sun in the central asteroid belt at a distance of 2.4–2.7 AU once every 4 years and 1 month (1,484 days; semi-major axis of 2.55 AU). Its orbit has an eccentricity of 0.04 and an inclination of 3° with respect to the ecliptic.

Physical characteristics 

Rudneva is an assumed stony S-type asteroid.

Rotation period 

In April 2003, a fragmentary rotational lightcurve of Rudneva was obtained from photometric observations by French amateur astronomer René Roy. Lightcurve analysis gave a rotation period of 44 hours with a brightness amplitude of at least 0.1 magnitude. As of 2017, no secure period of Rudneva has been obtained.

Diameter and albedo 

According to the survey carried out by the NEOWISE mission of NASA's Wide-field Infrared Survey Explorer, Rudneva measures between 10.977 and 11.848 kilometers in diameter and its surface has an albedo between 0.18 and 0.232.

The Collaborative Asteroid Lightcurve Link assumes a standard albedo for stony asteroids of 0.20 and calculates a diameter of 11.83 kilometers based on an absolute magnitude of 12.0.

Naming 

This minor planet was named after Ukrainian-born Yevgeniya Rudneva (1920–1944) a member of the Astronomical–Geodetical Society of the U.S.S.R., head of the solar department, and Hero of the Soviet Union. She voluntarily joined the army as a navigator in the all-female Night Bombers Aviation Regiment, known as the Night Witches. She died in April 1944, while flying her 645th combat mission. The official  was published by the Minor Planet Center on 20 February 1976.

References

External links 
 Asteroid Lightcurve Database (LCDB), query form (info )
 Dictionary of Minor Planet Names, Google books
 Asteroids and comets rotation curves, CdR – Observatoire de Genève, Raoul Behrend
 Discovery Circumstances: Numbered Minor Planets (1)-(5000) – Minor Planet Center
 
 

001907
Discoveries by Nikolai Chernykh
Named minor planets
19720911